HD 187085 is a yellow–hued star in the southern constellation of Sagittarius. It is too faint to be visible to the naked eye, having an apparent visual magnitude of +7.225. The star is located at a distance of approximately 1,010 light years from the Sun based on parallax, and is drifting further away with a radial velocity of +18 km/s.

This is an ordinary G-type main-sequence star with a stellar classification of G0V, which means it is generating energy through core hydrogen fusion. It is younger than the Sun with an estimated age of 2.7 billion years and is spinning with a leisurely rotation period of around 21 days. The star is 27% larger and 19% more massive than the Sun. It is radiating 2.3 times the luminosity of the Sun from its photosphere at an effective temperature of 6,117 K.

In 2006, an extrasolar planet was announced orbiting HD 187085, with a minimum mass slightly below that of the planet Jupiter. The orbit overlaps the habitable zone of this star. In 2009, the presence of an infrared excess was announced, suggesting a debris disk orbits the star.

See also
 HD 188015
 HD 20782
 List of extrasolar planets

References

External links
 

G-type main-sequence stars
Planetary systems with one confirmed planet
Circumstellar disks
Sagittarius (constellation)
Durchmusterung objects
187085
097546